Foxheads Stalk This Land is the debut album by Scottish band Close Lobsters, produced by John A. Rivers and released in 1987.

Track listing
 "Just Too Bloody Stupid" – 3:24
 "Sewer Pipe Dream" – 3:07
 "I Kiss the Flowers in Bloom" – 3:27
 "Pathetique" – 2:38
 "A Prophecy" – 4:45
 "In Spite Of These Times" – 3:35
 "Foxheads" – 2:49
 "I Take Bribes" – 2:12
 "Pimps" – 3:47
 "Mother of God" – 7:55

References

External links 

 

1987 debut albums
Close Lobsters albums
Albums produced by John A. Rivers
Fire Records (UK) albums
Enigma Records albums